Priyanka Goswami (born 10 March 1996) is an Indian athlete who competes in the 20 kilometres race walk. She represented India at the Tokyo Olympics, finishing in 17th position. She won the silver medal in 10000 meters walk at the 2022 Commonwealth Games.  
She is first Indian woman to win a medal in race walk with a silver in 10,000m event.

Biography 
Goswami practised gymnastics at school for a few months before switching to athletics. She was attracted to running because of the prize bags available to successful competitors.

In February 2021, she won the Indian Racewalking Championship in the 20 km race, with a new Indian record of 1:28.45, and qualified for the 2020 Summer Olympics. She previously won the Indian Racewalking championship in 2017.

She works as an OS for Indian Railways.

References

External links
 
 "Racewalker Priyanka Goswami had no idea about Olympics. And then Tokyo 2020 happened." (from thebridge.in)

1996 births
Living people
Indian female racewalkers
People from Muzaffarnagar
Athletes from Uttar Pradesh
Sportswomen from Uttar Pradesh
Athletes (track and field) at the 2020 Summer Olympics
Olympic athletes of India
Athletes (track and field) at the 2022 Commonwealth Games
Commonwealth Games silver medallists for India
Commonwealth Games medallists in athletics
Medallists at the 2022 Commonwealth Games